The Canton Indian Insane Asylum, aka Hiawatha Insane Asylum, was a federal facility for Native Americans located in Canton, South Dakota, between 1898 and 1934.

History
In 1898, Congress passed a bill creating the only 'Institution for Insane Indians' in the United States. The Canton Indian Insane Asylum (sometimes called Hiawatha Insane Asylum) opened for the reception of patients in January 1903. The first administrator was Oscar S. Gifford. Many of the inmates were not mentally ill. Native Americans risked being confined in the asylum for alcoholism, opposing government or business interests, or for being culturally misunderstood. A 1927 investigation conducted by the Bureau of Indian Affairs determined that a large number of patients showed no signs of mental illness. While open, more than 350 patients were detained there, in terrible conditions. At least 121 died. The asylum was closed in 1934.

Canton Indian Insane Asylum Cemetery 
Land was set aside for a cemetery, but the Indian Office decided that stone markers for graves would be an unwarranted expense. Today, the cemetery, with at least 121 burials, is located north of the junction of U.S. Route 18 and the former Chicago, Milwaukee, St. Paul and Pacific railroad tracks

The National Park Service added the cemetery to the National Register of Historic Places in 1998.

In Literature 

Kent Nerburn's The Girl Who Sang to the Buffalo includes accounts of conditions and resident's lives within the facility.

References

External links
Indian Country Today report June 14, 2016
Hiawatha Indian ASylum cemetery listing at FInd a grave
Hiawatha Insane Asylum
"If you knew the conditions..."
Hiawatha Foundation
"Wild Indians", Native Perspectives, Pemina Yellow Bird

1893 establishments in South Dakota
Hospitals established in 1893
Hospital buildings completed in 1903
1934 disestablishments in South Dakota
Psychiatric hospitals in South Dakota
Native American segregation in the United States
Government buildings in South Dakota
Buildings and structures in Lincoln County, South Dakota
Cemeteries on the National Register of Historic Places in South Dakota
National Register of Historic Places in Lincoln County, South Dakota
Native American health
Native American history of South Dakota